The 1997 Belgian Grand Prix (formally the LV Belgian Grand Prix) was a Formula One motor race held at Spa-Francorchamps on 24 August 1997. It was the twelfth race of the 1997 Formula One World Championship.

The 44-lap race was won by Michael Schumacher, driving a Ferrari. Giancarlo Fisichella finished second in a Jordan-Peugeot, with Heinz-Harald Frentzen third in a Williams-Renault after Mika Häkkinen's McLaren-Mercedes was disqualified due to a fuel irregularity. Schumacher's Drivers' Championship rival, Jacques Villeneuve, finished fifth in the other Williams-Renault, having started from pole position.

With the win, Schumacher extended his lead over Villeneuve in the Drivers' Championship to 11 points with five races remaining.

Report
The race is regarded by many as one of Schumacher's greatest drives. He started from third on the grid after qualifying had been dominated by his World Championship rival, Jacques Villeneuve. In the morning warm-up, which took place in hot, dry weather, Schumacher was only 15th. However, to everyone's surprise, heavy rain started to fall around half an hour before the scheduled race start and continued for around twenty minutes, completely changing the conditions and resulting in the field starting behind the safety car, the first time this happened in Formula One history.

In the excitement, Schumacher's brother Ralf - who had qualified sixth - spun and crashed his Jordan at Stavelot while going to take his place on the grid. He was forced to start from the pit lane in his spare car. Explaining the incident to ITV later, he said: "I had nothing to lose, and I lost it.".  Also during the period of cars assembling on the grid Michael Schumacher made exploratory laps (by returning to the pits rather than the grid) in both his race car and the spare Ferrari, enabling him to assess the track situation and choose the spare that had been set-up for intermediate weather conditions.

Of the front runners, both Williams drivers and Jean Alesi in the Benetton - alongside Villeneuve on the front row - started on full wet tyres while the others started on intermediates. The safety car circulated for the first three laps, and at the end of lap 4 - the first proper racing lap - Villeneuve continued to lead from Alesi and Schumacher. However, this was where the German driver started to take control of the race. He made a brave pass inside Alesi at the La Source hairpin at the start of lap 5, then overtook Villeneuve at the Rivage loop on the same lap. By the end of the lap he was already 5.8 seconds ahead, and on the next lap he stretched this lead to 16.9 seconds, with Giancarlo Fisichella - whose Jordan had also started on intermediates - moving into second after Villeneuve unexpectedly pitted.

Schumacher continued to pull further away, and by lap 12 his lead had reached a full minute, while Villeneuve had dropped to 16th following a second pit stop. By now, the track was drying and the drivers were pitting for slick tyres. Schumacher pitted in this manner on lap 14 and thereafter cruised, eventually winning by 26 seconds. Fisichella held off the McLaren of Mika Häkkinen for second, thus achieving his best finish in F1 at the time; the top six was completed by the second Williams of Heinz-Harald Frentzen, the Sauber of Johnny Herbert and Villeneuve, who had charged back in the later stages of the race and set the fastest lap.

After the race, Häkkinen was disqualified due to a fuel irregularity, thus promoting Frentzen to third, Herbert to fourth, Villeneuve to fifth and the second Benetton of Gerhard Berger to sixth. Nonetheless, Schumacher extended his lead over Villeneuve in the Drivers' Championship to 11 points, while Ferrari led Williams by six points in the Constructors' Championship.

Classification

Qualifying

* Ralf Schumacher and Trulli would start from the pitlane.

Race

Championship standings after the race 

Drivers' Championship standings

Constructors' Championship standings

References

Belgian Grand Prix
Belgian Grand Prix
Grand Prix
Belgian Grand Prix